Chauvinism is the unreasonable belief in the superiority or dominance of one's own group or people, who are seen as strong and virtuous, while others are considered weak, unworthy, or inferior. It can be described as a form of extreme patriotism and nationalism, a fervent faith in national excellence and glory.

In English, the word has also come to be used in some quarters as shorthand for male chauvinism, a trend reflected in Merriam-Webster's Dictionary, which, as of 2018, began its first example of use of the term chauvinism with "an attitude of superiority toward members of the opposite sex".

As nationalism
According to legend, French soldier Nicolas Chauvin was badly wounded in the Napoleonic Wars and received a meager pension for his injuries. After Napoleon abdicated, Chauvin maintained his fanatical Bonapartist belief in the messianic mission of Imperial France, despite the unpopularity of this view under the Bourbon Restoration. His single-minded devotion to his cause, despite neglect by his faction and harassment by its enemies, started the use of the term.

Chauvinism has extended from its original use to include fanatical devotion and undue partiality to any group or cause to which one belongs, especially when such partisanship includes prejudice against or hostility toward outsiders or rival groups and persists even in the face of overwhelming opposition. This French quality finds its parallel in the English-language term jingoism, which has retained the meaning of chauvinism strictly in its original sense; that is, an attitude of belligerent nationalism.

In 1945, political theorist Hannah Arendt described the concept thus:

In this sense, chauvinism is irrational, in that no one can claim their nation or ethnic group to be inherently superior to another. An example of a modern-day English nationalist extreme enough to be considered a chauvinist is Nigel Farage.

Male chauvinism

Male chauvinism is the belief that men are superior to women. The first documented use of the phrase "male chauvinism" is in the 1935 Clifford Odets play Till the Day I Die.

In the workplace
The balance of the workforce changed during World War II. As men entered or were conscripted into the military to fight in the war, women started replacing them. After the war ended, men returned home to find jobs in the workplace now occupied by women, which "threatened the self-esteem many men derive from their dominance over women in the family, the economy, and society at large." Consequently, male chauvinism was on the rise, according to Cynthia B. Lloyd.

Lloyd and Michael Korda have argued that as they integrated back into the workforce, men returned to predominate, holding positions of power while women worked as their secretaries, usually typing dictations and answering telephone calls. This division of labor was understood and expected, and women typically felt unable to challenge their position or male superiors, argue Korda and Lloyd.

Causes
Chauvinist assumptions are seen by some as a bias in the TAT psychological personality test. Through cross-examinations, the TAT exhibits a tendency toward chauvinistic stimuli for its questions and has the "potential for unfavorable clinical evaluation" for women.

An often cited study done in 1976 by Sherwyn Woods, Some Dynamics of Male Chauvinism, attempts to find the underlying causes of male chauvinism.
Adam Jukes argues that a reason for male chauvinism is masculinity itself:For the vast majority of people all over the world, the mother is a primary carer...There’s an asymmetry in the development of boys and girls. Infant boys have to learn how to be masculine. Girls don’t. Masculinity is not in a state of crisis. Masculinity is a crisis. I don’t believe misogyny is innate, but I believe it’s inescapable because of the development of masculinity.

Female chauvinism

Female chauvinism is the belief that women are superior to men. Second-wave feminist Betty Friedan observed that "...the assumption that women have any moral or spiritual superiority as a class is [...] female chauvinism." Ariel Levy used the term in her book Female Chauvinist Pigs, in which she argues that many young women in the United States and beyond are replicating male chauvinism and older misogynist stereotypes.

See also

 American exceptionalism 
 Avant-garde
 Blind nationalism
 Carbon chauvinism
 Great Russian chauvinism
 Han chauvinism
 National symbolism
 Planetary chauvinism
 Romanticism
 Sexism
 Social chauvinism
 Supremacism
 Welfare chauvinism

References

Further reading 
Huddy, Leonie; Del Ponte, Alessandro. (2019). National Identity, Pride, and Chauvinism—their Origins and Consequences for Globalization Attitudes. In Liberal Nationalism and Its Critics: Normative and Empirical Questions (eds) Gina Gustavsson, David Miller. Oxford: Oxford Academic, pp. 38–56. https://doi.org/10.1093/oso/9780198842545.003.0003

Tuchowski, Andrzej. (2017). Nationalism, Chauvinism and Racism as Reflected in European Musical Thought and in Compositions from the Interwar Period. Bern: Peter Lang. ISBN 9783631787274.

External links 

 The Association for the Study of Ethnicity and Nationalism (ASEN)
 Nostalgic Nationalism, Welfare Chauvinism, and Migration Anxieties in Central and Eastern Europe at the Lund University Research Portal.

 
Prejudices